Almaty monuments are works of art, mostly monuments, installed in Almaty, Kazakhstan to commemorate people or historical events.

History 
The state list of monuments of history and culture of national importance of Almaty city was approved by the Kazakh SSR Government Decree № 38, January 26, 1982. The list of monuments of local importance was approved by decision № 2/35 of the executive committee of the Almaty City Council of People's Deputies on January 26, 1984. After that in 1985-1988 there were several additions made. In these years, the number of monuments located around the city of Almaty and protected by the state, according to the state list, was 77 units. On December 30, 2011 the government of the Republic of Kazakhstan adopted the decree № 1672 "On deprivation of status of historical and cultural monuments of local importance to the city of Almaty and their exclusion from the State List of historical and cultural monuments of local importance. According to this decree 35 monuments are excluded from the state list of historical and cultural monuments of local importance because of complete physical loss and loss of historical and cultural value. Of these, 11 are architectural monuments: the former airport, the Medeu hotel, the house of merchant Murov, the Sofia church, the house of Hodjaev, the office of the Governor-General, the building of the Semirechensk Regional Department of Nationalities Affairs, the building of the railway station of Almaty-1 station, a department store, the club-theater of the Kazakh SSR NKVD, the house of gardener Breusov; nine monuments of monumental art: two monuments to V. Lenin, a monument to S. M. Kirov, a bust of L. P. Emelev, a bust of P. Vinogradov, a monument to the fighters of the October Revolution, a monument to M. Frunze, a monument and a bust of M. Kalinin; also 15 archaeological monuments: mounds located in the districts of Uljan, Kokkainar, Stroitel, Zarya Vostoka. In 2006, the city had 133 monuments of history and culture, 87 of architecture and 46 of monumental art, of which 30 were of national importance.

List of monuments by city districts

Almaly district

Auezov district

Bostandyq district

Jetysu district

Medeu district

Turksib district

Reference list 

Lists of monuments and memorials
Almaty
Buildings and structures in Almaty